The Air Force Space Command Space Operations Squadron is a United States Air Force Air Force Space Command satellite operations unit located at Peterson AFB, Colorado.

History
The unit was formed as the Air Force Space Command Space Operations Flight on 31 May 1994, and activated on 1 July 1994.  The unit was later redesignated the Air Force Space Command Space Operations Squadron on 15 August 1998.

Previous designations
 AFSPC Space Operations Squadron (15 August 1998–Present)
 AFSPC Space Operations Flight (31 May 1994-15 August 1998)

Locations
 Peterson AFB, Colorado (1 July 1994–Present)

Decorations
Air Force Organizational Excellence Award
1 March 2004-1 March 2006
1 November 2000-31 October 2002

References

External links

Space Operations AFSPC
Military units and formations in Colorado